Minquan North railway station is a railway station on the Zhengzhou–Xuzhou section of the Eurasia Continental Bridge corridor in Minquan County, Shangqiu, Henan, China. The station started operation on 10 September 2016, together with the railway.

Station Layout

References

Buildings and structures in Henan
Railway stations in Henan
Stations on the Xuzhou–Lanzhou High-Speed Railway
Railway stations in China opened in 2016
Shangqiu